Francisco Garza Gutiérrez (14 March 1904 – 30 October 1965) was a Mexican footballer who played as a defender.

Career
Born in Mexico City, Gutiérrez participated in the 1930 FIFA World Cup, playing in only one game versus Argentina. His older brother was Rafael Garza Gutiérrez. They played in the same club Club América.

Sources 
 A.Gowarzewski : "FUJI Football Encyclopedia. World Cup FIFA*part I*Biographical Notes - Heroes of Mundials"; GiA Katowice 1993

External links
 

1904 births
1965 deaths
Footballers from Mexico City
Association football defenders
Mexican footballers
Mexico international footballers
1930 FIFA World Cup players
Club América footballers